The BritAma Arena (Indonesian:  Arena BritAma), also known as Kelapa Gading Sports Mall or Mahaka Square, is an indoor sporting arena located in the affluent Kelapa Gading subdistrict in North Jakarta, Indonesia.

The arena plays host to the basketball games of Indonesia's most successful club basketball team Satria Muda BritAma in the Indonesian Basketball League and ASEAN Basketball League (ABL), and also serves as the venue of some sporting and trade events in the North Jakarta area. The arena hosted the third game of the 2010 ABL Finals, and was the venue of the 2011 Southeast Asian basketball tournament, as well as the first annual eSport exhibition at Asian Games 2018.

As Bank Rakyat Indonesia, through its brand "Tabungan BritAma", is the main sponsor of what used to be known as the Satria Muda Mahaka Jakarta team, it also has the naming rights for the venue; therefore "The BritAma Arena".

See also
 List of indoor arenas
 Mata Elang International Stadium
 Istora Gelora Bung Karno
 DBL Arena
 Palembang Sport and Convention Center

References

External links
 The BritAma Arena Sports Mall - Official Website

ASEAN Basketball League venues
Sports venues in Jakarta
Indoor arenas in Indonesia
Basketball venues in Indonesia
Basketball venues in Jakarta
Boxing venues in Indonesia
Boxing venues in Jakarta
North Jakarta
Venues of the 2018 Asian Games
Southeast Asian Games basketball venues